He Xiangjian (born October 5, 1942) is the co-founder of Midea, one of China's largest appliance makers. In September 2021, his net worth was estimated to be $28.8 billion by Bloomberg Billionaires Index, positioning him at the 51st place in the index.

Life

In 1968 Beijiao, Guangdong, He formed the lid production company that would be come Midea.

He stepped down from operations of Midea in 2012.

He is married with three children and lives in Foshan in Junlan International Golf Life Village, a villa neighbourhood developed by Midea Real Estate Group.

He is a noted art collector and founded the He Art Museum, a privately funded non-profit museum designed by Pritzker Prize winner Tadao Ando.

It is reported that there was an attempted kidnapping of He in June 2020. Assailants are alleged to have broken in to He's villa at Foshan, He's son, He Jianfeng, escaping and alerting local police, who are said to have rescued He and arrested five suspects.

References

External links
Hurun Report Profile
Forbes profile

Billionaires from Guangdong
1942 births
Living people